Grzegorz Marek Myszkowski (born 16 April 1961) is a Polish windsurfer. He competed in the men's Division II event at the 1988 Summer Olympics, finishing in 17th place.

References

External links
 
 
 

1961 births
Living people
Polish windsurfers
Polish male sailors (sport)
Olympic sailors of Poland
Sailors at the 1988 Summer Olympics – Division II
Sportspeople from Poznań